Autoroute 40 may refer to:
 Quebec Autoroute 40 a Quebec highway
 A40 autoroute, a French motorway

See also 
 A40 roads
 List of highways numbered 40